A list of the films produced in the cinema of Georgia in the 1970s, ordered by year of release:

External links
 Library of National filmography
 Georgian film at the Internet Movie Database
 http://www.babaduli.de

1970s
Films
Lists of 1970s films

ka:ქართული ფილმების სია
ru:Список фильмов Грузии